Jiangsu Shagang Group Huaigang Special Steel Co., Ltd. (known as Huaigang or Huaisteel) is a Chinese steel manufacturer based in Huai'an, Jiangsu Province. It was a subsidiary of privately held company Shagang Group via its publicly traded subsidiary Shagang Company for 63.79% stake, from 2010 to 2015. As at 31 December 2013, Huaigang accounted for 99.9% revenue and 97% assets of Shagang Company. However, as at 31 December 2015, Shagang Group owned just 19.88% stake in Shagang Company; in turn Shagang Company owned 63.79% stake of Huaigang.

, Shagang Company is a constituent of SZSE 200 Index (mid cap index).

History
Huaigang Group Co., Ltd. was incorporated on 11 December 1996 as a subsidiary of the Economic Commission of Huai'an (the city was known as Huaiyin at that time) for 91.97% stake. In 2000, Nanjing Iron and Steel Group acquired the controlling stake (93.49%). It was recapitalized in 2003, making the stake held by Nanjing Iron and Steel Group was diluted to 26.15%. Moreover, private investors were introduced. In 2005, the 26.15% stake was returned to Huai'an Municipal People's Government from Nanjing Iron and Steel Group. In June 2006, privately held company Shagang Group acquired 64.40% stake of Huaigang from other private investors. The stake was injected to a publicly traded company Gaoxin Zhangtong as a reverse IPO in 2010 (now known as Shagang Company). In December 2006 Huai'an Municipal Government also sold their stake to Jiangyin Wande. The shareholder of Jiangyin Wande, Li Xinren, also owned the shares of Shagang Group.

In 2011 the company was re-incorporated as a company limited by shares, issuing 1.431 billion shares with par value  each.

Joint Venture
Huaigang formed a joint venture with Tianjin Pipe Corporation. Huaigang owned 40% stake.

Financial data

References

External links
 

Chinese companies established in 1986
Steel companies of China
Chemical companies of China
Manufacturing companies established in 1986
Government agencies established in 1970
Chinese companies established in 1970
Companies based in Jiangsu
Civilian-run enterprises of China
Huai'an
Former government-owned companies of China
Companies listed on the Shenzhen Stock Exchange